General elections were held in Pakistan on Wednesday, 25 July 2018 to elect the members of 15th National Assembly and the four Provincial Assemblies. The three major parties Pakistan Tehreek-e-Insaf (PTI) led by Imran Khan, the Pakistan Muslim League led by Shehbaz Sharif and the Pakistan Peoples Party led by Bilawal Bhutto. The PTI won the most seats in the National Assembly but fell short of a majority; the party subsequently formed a coalition government with several smaller parties.  At the provincial level, the PTI remained the largest party in Khyber Pakhtunkhwa (KP); the Pakistan Peoples Party (PPP) retained its dominance in Sindh and the newly formed Balochistan Awami Party (BAP) emerged as the largest party in Balochistan. In Punjab, the result was a hung parliament with the Pakistan Muslim League (N) (PML-N) winning the most seats. However, after several independents MPAs joined the PTI, the latter became the largest party and was able to form a government.

Opinion polling prior to the campaigns starting had initially shown leads for the Pakistan Muslim League (N) (PML-N) over the PTI. However, from an 11-point lead, the PML-N's lead began to diminish in the final weeks of the campaign, with some polls close to the election showing the PTI with a marginal but increasing lead. In the lead-up to the elections, there were rumours about some pre-poll rigging being conducted by the judiciary, the military and the intelligence agencies to sway the election results in favour of the PTI and against the PML-N. However, Reuters polling suggested PML-N's lead had genuinely narrowed in the run-up to the elections, and that the party had suffered "blow after blow" which caused setbacks to any hopes of re-election.

Election day saw the PTI receive 31.82% of the vote (its highest share of the vote since its foundation), while the PML-N received 24.35%. Following the elections, six major parties including PML-N claimed there had been large-scale vote rigging and administrative malpractices. Imran Khan, chairman of the PTI, proceeded to form a coalition government, announcing his cabinet shortly after the elections. The newly formed coalition government included members of the Muttahida Qaumi Movement and Pakistan Muslim League (Q).

Regarding the voting process, the Election Commission of Pakistan (ECP) outrightly rejected reports of rigging and stated that the elections had been fair and free. A top electoral watchdog, Free and Fair Election Network (FAFEN), also said that the 2018 general elections in Pakistan had been "more transparent in some aspects" than the previous polls. In its preliminary report, the European Union Election Observation Mission said that no rigging had been observed during the election day in general, but found a "lack of equality" and criticized the process more than it had in the Pakistani election of 2013.

This was also the third consecutive election from Pakistan's most recent transition to democracy where a democratic handover of power was observed. The day after the election, despite reservations over the result, PML-N conceded defeat. Pakistan's election commission reiterated its position, rejecting reports of rigging. The voter turnout dropped from 55.0% in 2013 to 51.7%.

Although the election commission rejected rigging allegations, there were claims that Khan was able to lure more electable candidates to his party than PML-N, which led to suggestions that there was electoral inequality. However, the newly minted opposition decided against boycotting parliament, lending legitimacy to the electoral process by parliamentary participation. Initially a recount was ordered in 14 constituencies because of procedural errors. Moreover, procedural errors then led to a recount on 70 constituencies by the election commission (more than the winners margin of victory in Punjab and Federal elections). After the conclusion of these recounts, the ECP published a seat tally which confirmed PTI's position of being the largest party in the National Assembly. The margin for the Punjab election was narrow between Khan's PTI and Pakistan Muslim League (N), but independents and Pakistan Muslim League (Q) factions endorsed federal winners PTI, which led to Khan's party forming government in Punjab also. Thus PML-N lost the elections both at the provincial and the federal level, becoming the opposition, nominating Shehbaz Sharif to be leader of the opposition at the federal level and his son Hamza Shahbaz as opposition leader in Punjab.

Background

2013 elections 

Following the elections in 2013, Pakistan Muslim League (Nawaz), led by twice Prime Minister of Pakistan Nawaz Sharif, emerged as the largest party with 166 seats out of a total of 342 in the National Assembly. Although this was short of a majority, Sharif was able to form a government after several independents joined his party.

During the election campaign, Pakistan Tehreek-e-Insaf (PTI), led by prominent cricketer turned politician Imran Khan, was widely expected to have huge success in the polls. The party fell short of these expectations, instead only taking 35 seats. It became the 3rd largest party in the National Assembly and formed a coalition government in the restive north-western province of Khyber Pakhtunkhwa.

Azadi march (2014) 

PTI had initially conceded the elections to PML (N), although they asked for manual recounts to be carried out in several constituencies where rigging had been allegedly carried out. These calls were not answered by the government or the Supreme Court, despite a 2,100 page white paper by the party which allegedly contained evidence of vote-rigging in favour of the PML (N). The Azadi March of 2014 (Azadi meaning Freedom in Urdu) was started by Khan on 14 August 2014 which demanded the government to call a snap election. The sit-in in Islamabad continued for 126 days, until the 2014 Peshawar school massacre occurred, which forced Khan to end the protest for the sake of ‘national unity’. A judicial commission was formed by the government which would probe the allegations of vote-rigging: it found the election to have been largely conducted in a free and fair manner, while also stating that PTI's request for a probe was not "entirely unjustified".

Panama Papers case (2016) 

On 3 April 2016 the International Consortium of Investigative Journalists (ICIJ) made 11.5 million secret documents, later known as the Panama Papers, available to the public. The documents, sourced from Panamanian law firm Mossack Fonseca, among other revelations about other public figures in many other countries,  included details of eight offshore companies with links to the family of Nawaz Sharif, the then-incumbent Prime Minister of Pakistan, and his brother Shehbaz Sharif, the incumbent Chief Minister of Punjab. According to the ICIJ, Sharif's children Maryam Nawaz, Hassan Nawaz and Hussain Nawaz “were owners or had the right to authorise transactions for several companies”.

Sharif refused to resign and instead make an unsuccessful attempt to form a judicial commission. The opposition leader Khan filed a petition to the Supreme Court of Pakistan on 29 August seeking the disqualification of Sharif from public office (which would automatically remove him of the office of Prime Minister). This petition was also supported by prominent political leaders Sheikh Rasheed (AML) and Siraj-ul-Haq (PAT). Khan called, once again, for his supporters to put Islamabad in lockdown until Sharif resigned, although this was called off soon before it was meant to take place.

On 20 April 2017, on a 3-2 verdict, the Supreme Court decided against the disqualification of Sharif, instead calling for a Joint Investigation Team (JIT) to be created which would probe these allegations further.

On 10 July 2017, JIT submitted a 275-page report in the apex court. The report requested NAB to file a reference against Sharif, his daughter Maryam, and his sons under section 9 of National Accountability Ordinance. Additionally, the report claimed that his daughter Maryam was guilty of falsifying documents, as she submitted a document from 2006 which used the Calibri font despite the font itself not being available for public use until 2007.

Disqualification of Nawaz Sharif (2017) 
On 28 July 2017, following the submittal of the JIT report, the Supreme Court unanimously decided that Sharif was dishonest, therefore not fulfilling the requirements of articles 62 and 63 of the constitution which require one who holds public office to be Sadiq and Ameen (Urdu for Truthful and Virtuous). Hence, he was disqualified as Prime Minister and as a Member of the National Assembly. The court also ordered National Accountability Bureau to file a reference against Sharif, his family and his former Finance Minister Ishaq Dar on corruption charges.

Electoral system 
The 342 members of the National Assembly are elected by two methods in three categories; 272 are elected in single-member constituencies by first-past-the-post voting; 60 are reserved for women and 10 for religious minority groups; both sets of reserved seats use proportional representation with a 5% electoral threshold. This proportional number, however, is based on the number of seats won rather than votes cast. To win a simple majority, a party would have to take 137 seats.

The 2018 General Elections were held under new delimitation can of constituencies as a result of 2017 Census of Pakistan. Parliament of Pakistan amended the Constitution, allowing a one-time exemption for redrawing constituency boundaries using 2017 provisional census results. As per the notification issued on 5 March 2018, the Islamabad Capital Territory (ICT) now has three constituencies, Punjab 141, Sindh 61, Khyber Pakhtunkhwa 39, Balochistan 16 and Federally Administered Tribal Areas (FATA) has 12 constituencies in the National Assembly. 106 million people were registered to vote for members of the National Assembly of Pakistan and four Provincial Assemblies.

Likewise for elections to provincial assemblies, Punjab has 297 constituencies, Sindh 130, Khyber Pakhtunkhwa 99 and Balochistan 51.

Electoral reforms 
In June 2017 the Economic Coordination Committee approved the procurement of new printing machines with a bridge loan of 864 million rupees. The government has also developed new software for the Election Commission of Pakistan and NADRA to ensure a "free, fair, impartial, transparent and peaceful general election." The former Federal Law Minister Zahid Hamid elaborated that youth reaching the age of 18 will automatically be registered as voters when they apply for a CNIC from NADRA.

Contesting parties

Campaign

Major by-elections (2017–2018) 
Following the disqualification of Nawaz Sharif, several by-elections were held throughout Pakistan.

Lahore by-election, September 2017 
The first of these was the by-election in Sharif's former constituency, NA-120 Lahore, which is located in the capital city of the Punjab province, a province where the PML (N) was the ruling party. It retained this seat, albeit with a much reduced majority due to gains by the PTI and minor Islamist parties.

Peshawar by-election, October 2017 
The second of these was a by election in Peshawar, capital city of the Khyber Pakhtunkhwa province, where the Pakistan Tehreek-e-Insaf| was the ruling party. NA-4 once again voted for PTI, despite a reduced majority: once again mainly due to the rise of Islamist parties. These by-elections largely were largely seen as indicators that the ruling parties in both Khyber Pakhtunkhwa and Punjab were still electorally strong.

Lodhran by-election, 2018 
On 15 December 2017, Jahangir Khan Tareen, General Secretary of the PTI, was disqualified from holding public office. Hence, his NA-154 Lodhran seat was vacated.

In a previous by-election in this constituency in 2015, Tareen won this seat with a majority in excess of 35,000 votes. Therefore, this seat was seen as a stronghold for the PTI.

In what was seen as an upset result, Iqbal Shah of the PML (N) won this by-election with a majority over 25,000 votes against Jahangir Tareen's son, Ali Tareen. Many saw this as a failure on the PTI's behalf, and the result led to a drop in morale for PTI workers.

Campaigning 
The National Assembly and provincial assemblies of Pakistan dissolved as early as 28 May for Khyber Pakhtunkhwa and Sindh, and as late as 31 May for Punjab, Balochistan, and the National Assembly.

The assemblies dissolved during the holy month of Ramadan, a month where Muslims worldwide refrain from eating or drinking from sunrise to sundown. Hence, most major parties did not start campaigning until late June.

Nomination papers 
On 4 June, parties and individuals started filing nomination papers for the elections. This process continued until 8 June. After this, the returning officer in each constituency began scrutiny of the nominated candidates and decided whether or not to accept the nomination papers.

The scrutiny resulted in many high-profile politicians having their nomination papers rejected: Imran Khan (chairman of PTI), Farooq Sattar (chairman of Muttahida Qaumi Movement (Pakistan) (MQM-P)) and Pervez Musharraf (chairman of All Pakistan Muslim League and former President), had their nomination papers rejected. Both Sattar and Khan had their nomination papers  later accepted.

Additionally, politicians Fawad Chaudhry (Information Secretary of PTI) and Shahid Khaqan Abbasi (former Prime Minister) were disqualified from contesting these elections by election tribunals due to the non declaration of assets in their nomination papers. This was controversial because election tribunals were seen as not having the jurisdiction to disqualify candidates, rather only to accept or reject their nomination papers. The Lahore High Court eventually overturned these judgements and allowed the respective candidates to contest their elections. Two major politicians of Tehreek-e-Insaf from Chakwal, Sardar Ghulam Abbas and  Sardar Aftab Akbar Khan were disqualified to contest elections producing major problem in Chakwal district for the party.

Pakistan Muslim League (Nawaz) 
Pakistan Muslim League (Nawaz) launched its election campaign on 25 June 2018 from Karachi. On 5 July 2018, PMLN unveiled its election manifesto. Nevertheless, it has been stated there was, "lack of equality of opportunity" in the pre-election campaign, and there were systematic attempts to undermine the ruling party PML-N.

Pakistan Tehreek-e-Insaf 
Pakistan Tehreek-e-Insaf started its election campaign on 24 June 2018 from Mianwali. On 9 July 2018, Imran Khan launched PTI's election manifesto. On 23 July 2018, PTI concluded its electioneering with rallies in Lahore.

Pakistan Peoples Party 
On 28 June 2018, PPP became the first political party to unveil its election manifesto. PPP kicked off its election campaign on 30 June 2018, as Bilawal inaugurated their election office in Lyari, Karachi.

Opinion polls

Conduct 
There were 272 national and 577 provincial assembly constituencies, contested by over 3,600 and 8,800 candidates respectively. A total of 811,491 staff were deployed for election duties as presiding officers, assistant presiding officers, and polling officers, in addition to 371,000 armed forces personnel who provided security duties alongside police and other law enforcement agencies. There were 85,317 polling stations set up, comprising over 242,000 polling booths. The election watchdog FAFEN deployed 19,683 neutral observers accredited with the Election Commission to observe the voting and counting process at over 72,000 polling stations.

Violence 

Several violent incidents took place in the month of July in the run up to the general election. In the beginning of the month, bombing targeted the PTI candidate for NA-48 (Tribal Area-IX), and the Muttahida Majlis-e-Amal's candidate in the Takhti Khel area of the Bannu. On 10 July, a suicide bombing by Tehrik-i-Taliban Pakistan (TTP) killed 20 people and injured 63 at an Awami National Party (ANP) rally in Peshawar. As the bombing killed ANP provincial candidate Haroon Bilour, the elections for Constituency PK-78 were postponed by the Election Commission. On 12 July, one political staff was killed in Peshawar, while two BAP staff were injured in Khuzdar. On 13 July, twin bombings by ISIS-K in Mastung and Bannu left 154 people dead and 220 injured. The bombings targeted JUI-F candidate Akram Khan Durrani, BAP candidate for the Nawabzada Siraj Raisani. On 22 July, the PTI candidate for constituency PK-99, Ikramullah Gandapur, was killed in a bombing near of Dera Ismail Khan. The same day, Akram Khan Durrani survived a second assassination attempt. On 24 July, three Pakistani Army soldiers and a civilian were killed in Kech District, Balochistan.

Several violent incidents took place on election day. A a bombing in Quetta killed 31 and injured 35. In Swabi, a clash between PTI and ANI supporters left one dead and three injured. Another three were injured in a grenade attack outside a polling station in Larkana, while a man was shot dead in a political clash in Khanewal. Several more people were injured in 7 other incidents.

Allegations of election meddling

Pre-poll
There have been allegations by some international journalists and scholars, claiming that there was a plan between judiciary and military bodies to influence the outcome of the election. These allegations were also made by the outgoing PML-N following Nawaz Sharif's disqualification for corruption. It was suggested that alleged goal of these attempts was to halt the party of Nawaz Sharif from coming into power and to bring the results in favor of PTI, so that Imran Khan – who is alleged as close to the military – can be installed as the prime minister. Khan has denied these allegations as a "foreign conspiracy" and "against the facts", while the military also categorically rejected them. There have been claims of PML (N)'s campaign material being ripped apart by authorities while leaving alone material belonging to PTI. There have been suggestions that candidates belonging to PML (N) have been coerced by ISI to switch to those parties whose future government can be better controlled by military. On the last day of scrutiny of nomination papers, seven PML (N) candidates from Southern Punjab returned their tickets leaving no option for PML (N) to field replacement candidates, depriving them an opportunity to win those seats. There have also been reports of election engineering by army and intelligence agencies in Balochistan province in favor of Balochistan Awami Party.

Reports further suggested that there was evidence of collusion between the judiciary and military, in that two military officials were appointed to the Joint Investigation Team to investigate corruption allegations against former prime minister Nawaz Sharif, which were further strengthened by the circumstances of the Avenfield case verdict against the Sharifs. Justice Shaukat Aziz Siddiqui, an Islamabad High Court senior justice, released a statement on 22 July alleging that judges were pressured by ISI not to release Sharif before the election. However, he provided no evidence and was at the time facing corruption and misconduct charges pending at the Supreme Judicial Council, leading to rumours about the timing of his statement. Pakistan's Chief Justice Saqib Nisar said he felt "saddened" at Siddiqui's comments, and whilst criticising them, stated that "as the head of judiciary, I assure you that we are not under any sort of pressure". There have been allegations that the micromanagement of political parties and the censorship of the newspapers, social media and TV channels is to further influence the election result. An official from the Human Rights Commission of Pakistan stated that "The level of army interference and political engineering is unprecedented." The summary of the Human Rights Commission of Pakistan fact finding exercise reported curbs on freedom of expression, including curbs to distribution in newspapers, TV, journalists, digital media and press advice and intimidation by intelligence agencies. The curbs were in favor of PTI, with respondents reporting that "criticism of the PTI" was a topic unpopular with the intelligence agencies. "Another reportedly common piece of press advice to the broadcast media [from the intelligence agencies] that the channel should give greater coverage to PTI rallies and only minimal coverage to other parties’ events". Another institution, the National Accountability Bureau has been described as being used by military intelligence agencies, including ISI, to bring politicians in line by threatening to bring corruption cases against them. Due to interference by military and intelligence agencies, The Financial Times described these elections as "the dirtiest in years".

Furthermore, the EU observer mission released their report after the election stating that there were "systematic attempts to undermine the ruling party", "lack of equality of opportunity", pressure on the media, far stronger efforts than usual to encourage switching parties and judicial conduct had all negatively influenced the vote.

Some of these allegations have also been made by certain political parties and figures more prominently by PML (N). Among the politicians, Farhatullah Babar has been very vocal against the election meddling by military describing it as a "creeping coup against civilian authority". Raza Rabbani also leveled same allegations including the Election Commission of Pakistan, National Accountability Bureau and security agencies as the culprit behind pre-poll rigging.

Election day
The election results were scheduled to be released 2am the next day; however, this was delayed due to glitches in "Results Transmission System" (RTS), an Android and iPhone-based app that was to be used for sending results from 85,000 polling stations to the ECP headquarters. The system was initially running smoothly but started to malfunction when the results started pouring in large numbers. Another issue was related to weak wifi and 3G signals: presiding officers could not get strong enough signals inside the polling station to transmit the result, and were not allowed to leave the station (to get better signals) until they had transmitted the result. Eventually the election results were sent back to the ECP via fax. Some alleged the delays were due to a "conspiracy".

Almost all political parties, with the exception of PTI, have alleged large scale election day rigging. The winning PTI have alleged rigging in some constituencies as well.  The fairness of the election was also criticized due to the Election Commission's failure to provide Form 45s, official forms which include the tally of votes and are prepared in the presence of political agents of all the candidates. Party leaders alleged that their representatives were barred from polling stations before counting began and the Form 45s were prepared in their absence and behind closed doors. In some instances, the representatives were given results on plain paper instead of official forms. In another instance, the presiding officer signed blank forms, allowing the possibility of results being manipulated afterwards. Independent candidate Jibran Nasir also made similar allegations. There was also an incident of seven people being  arrested for alleged vote rigging in Karachi. According to FAFEN observer Sarwar Bari, "Only one polling agent of every party is allowed when Form 45 is given out by the polling staff, so we can’t rule out the fact that it could be a misunderstanding." A few days after the election, in the NA-241 (Korangi Karachi-III) constituency, ballots cast for candidates of PML (N), PPP, and MQM-P were found in a garbage heap. A PTI candidate won the election in that constituency.

Chairman of winning party Imran Khan pledged that he will allow to open any constituency his opponents think are rigged, he said that opposition has full right into recounting or accountability over election process to ensure transparency.

The Free and Fair Election Network, an election watchdog, said the 2018 polls were "more transparent" in some aspects than the previous elections and that "significant improvements in the quality of critical electoral processes" inspired "greater public confidence". According to former Indian Chief Election Commissioner S. Y. Quraishi, a member of the international observers group in Pakistan, the election system was transparent, free and fair, and the minor technical glitches which showed up later in the day were due to inexperience.

On 12 August 2018, it was reported that 90% of Form-45s were not signed by any polling agent, which is a violation of Election Act 2017. However, an ECP spokesperson clarified the discrepancy by stating that there was no designated space on the Form-45s to obtain the signatures of polling agents. The signatures were instead done on tamper-evident bags that were used to transport the results. For the transparency reasons and to combat controversy surrounding form 45, election commission of Pakistan published all form 45 publicly on their website.

Results

National Assembly

Government formation
Despite rejecting the results of the election due to alleged rigging, the Pakistan Muslim League (N) made the decision to take oath in the elected assemblies for the sake of democracy, conceding that Pakistan Tehreek-e-Insaf’s Imran Khan was likely to be the Prime Minister. Hence, the government formation at the federal level was left to the PTI alone.

Talks began with smaller parties and independents to form a government. Muttahida Qaumi Movement which won six seats, Pakistan Muslim League (Q) which won four, Balochistan Awami Party which won four, Grand Democratic Alliance which won two, and thirteen independent candidates were invited to join the PTI-led government. Additionally, Awami Muslim League led by Sheikh Rasheed Ahmed, the party’s only MNA, had already vowed its support to PTI before the elections.

On 28 July, PML (Q) pledged its support to PTI’s candidates for Chief Minister of Punjab, making it unlikely to oppose PTI in the National Assembly. On 31 July, Balochistan Awami Party announced its support for a PTI led federal government.

On 1 August, Muttahida Qaumi Movement was told by the PPP that it had to choose between sitting in a coalition with them in Sindh or sitting in a coalition with PTI in the centre. On the same day, MQM-P convener Khalid Maqbool Siddiqui announced the party’s six MNAs would lend their support to the PTI in the National Assembly.

On 2 August, Pakistan Muslim League (N), Pakistan Peoples Party, Muttahida Majlis-e-Amal and Awami National Party announced to form a “Grand Opposition Alliance” whereby the Speaker, Prime Minister and other key posts would be jointly nominated and elected. The Speakership would be given to the PPP, the Deputy Speakership to the MMA and the Premiership to the PML-N. However, on 16 August, after the elections for speaker, PPP decided to withdraw their support for Shehbaz Sharif for the post of Prime Minister, owing to previous statements made by the individual about the party's co-chairman and ex-President of Pakistan, Asif Ali Zardari.

Over the next few weeks, other parties pledged their support towards the PTI nominees for speaker, deputy speaker. These parties include Balochistan National Party (Mengal), Grand Democratic Alliance and Jamhoori Watan Party. In addition to this, 9 independents joined the party.

Election for Speakers of the National Assembly
The election for the Speaker and Deputy Speaker of the National Assembly took place on 15 August 2018.

Election for Prime Minister
The election for Prime Minister took place on 17 August 2018.

Reactions

Domestic 
As the results began to pour in, many of the main opposition parties declared that the elections were not 'free and fair'.

The Election Commission of Pakistan denied the allegations but announced that it would be willing to investigate if proof was provided.

PTI chairman Imran Khan also addressed the allegations in his first national address and said that he would be willing to look into any allegations of rigging. He also added that he thought that the elections were the "cleanest in Pakistan's history."

Celebrations across Pakistan also erupted as early results indicated a win for Tehreek-e-Insaf. Khan's fellow cricketers and celebrities took to Twitter in celebration of his assumed victory even before election results were finalized or a government formed.

Economic

The Pakistan Stock Exchange (PSX) reacted positively and opened 2% higher as the prospect of a hung government dissipated. The KSE index closed 749 points higher on Thursday. On 3 July 2018, the benchmark KSE-100 index gained 314 points to reach 43,100 points. It closed up 770 points at 43,556 points. The US dollar shed Rs5.36 against the rupee in the inter-bank market for the first time in four years, falling to Rs122.5. The positive economic indicators are considered to be largely driven by what investors consider the return of political stability following the 25 July polls.

See also
 2018 Pakistani general election in Islamabad
 2018 Pakistani general election violence
 2018 Punjab provincial election
 2018 Sindh provincial election
 2018 Khyber Pakhtunkhwa provincial election
 2018 Balochistan provincial election
 2020 Gilgit-Baltistan Assembly election
 2022 Pakistan By Elections

References

 
2018 elections in Pakistan
Pakistan
General elections in Pakistan
July 2018 events in Pakistan
Electoral fraud in Pakistan
Election and referendum articles with incomplete results